Andrés López Gallo (born 26 May 2003), known as Andrés Castrín or just Castrín, is a Spanish footballer who plays for Polvorín FC as a central defender.

Club career
Born in Riotorto, Lugo, Galicia, Castrín played for ED Lourenzá, CD Lugo and Racing Club Villalbés as a youth. In 2021, after finishing his formation, he was assigned to Lugo's farm team Polvorín FC in the Tercera División RFEF.

Castrín made his senior debut on 25 September 2021, starting in a 0–0 away draw against Ourense CF. He scored his first senior goal on 31 October, netting his team's second in a 3–1 away win over UD Somozas.

Castrín made his first-team debut for Lugo on 2 December 2021, starting in a 2–2 away draw (4–3 penalty win) against AD Unión Adarve in the season's Copa del Rey. He made his professional debut fourteen days later, starting in a 1–2 home loss against CD Mirandés, also in the national cup.

Personal life
Castrín's older brother Pablo (also known as Castrín) is also a footballer and a centre back. Their father, Juan López, also played amateur football for local side Riotorto CF.

References

External links

2003 births
Living people
Sportspeople from the Province of Lugo
Spanish footballers
Footballers from Galicia (Spain)
Association football defenders
Tercera Federación players
Polvorín FC players
CD Lugo players